June Hudson (c. 1946) is a British television costume designer known for her work on various science fiction TV series in the 1970's, such as Doctor Who and Blake's 7.

Doctor Who 

Hudson commenced her tenure as a costume designer for Doctor Who in 1978, and subsequently assumed the role of principal costume designer in 1979. Her initial productions, namely The Ribos Operation (1978) and The Creature from the Pit (1979), garnered commendation from the series' producer, Graham Williams. Williams expressed his appreciation for Hudson's work and requested her involvement in at least two additional productions within the 1979-80 recording period.

June Hudson was asked to be the sole costume designer by John Nathan-Turner for Doctor Who's 18th season in 1980 due to her success in producing lavish effects on a limited budget. However, the BBC costume department felt that the responsibilities were too much for one person, and Hudson was asked to nominate a second designer. She chose Amy Roberts, whose style was similar to Hudson's bold and imaginative sensibility. Hudson's most notable costume designs included outfits for the principal characters, such as establishing a unique style for Lalla Ward's portrayal of the second Romana that became a fan favorite.

The armour for the Gundans, gorgeously conceived and finished, typifies Hudson's capacity to produce safe, comfortable, impressive costumes on a tight budget: the armor was actually made of thin, vacuum-formed plastic, and given is pewter finish by metal deposition, while the grills on the helmets were made from junked mail trays.

Hudson is one of the most broadly imaginative costume designers to work on Doctor Who, espousing not a whole range of different aesthetics, from fairy-tale, 'pre-Raphaelite' richness to minimalist, machine-turned-modernism. She is certainly one of the most remembered Doctor Who costume designers of the 1970s and 80s, equaling the output of James Acheson and Ken Trew, and producing designs of comparable importance in the enduring legacy of the show.

Blake's 7 

Her Blake's 7 costumes include (notable costumes in brackets) many of the costumes in the second series of the show: overall, her most notable contribution was putting the Liberator crew in leather, arguably one of the most memorable aspects of the show.

Redemption: Kerr Avon's dark blue leather and studs (dark leather and studs were to become the character's trademark), Roj Blake's voluminous green leather bat-sleeves and boots, Cally's wide-shouldered outfit.

Shadow: Avon's infamous silver leather tunic [Hudson refers to fans calling it "oven-ready"], studded belt and thigh-high black leather boots, opulent velvet suits for the Terra Nostra crime lords.

Weapon: Large, elaborately decorated collars for Servalan, Coser, Rashel and Clonemaster Fen. Servalan wearing the same white feather cloak as Romana in The Ribos Operation. Travis's new uniform is made of ribbed black material. Androgynous, flowing leotard-cloak-skirt combinations for Carnell and the Federation officer. Jenna and Cally's elaborately cut and pleated long dresses. Avon's infamous red leather "lobster suit" proved difficult with producers, directors and the actor himself. The original costume included conical spikes on the collar, which she had originally designed to symbolize the character's angry nature, but which had to be removed at the insistence of the producer. [Source: June Hudson's interview, Blake's 7 Season 3 DVD extras]

Horizon: Velvet costumes for Ro and the Federation officers, flowing blue robes with elaborate feather decorations for Ro and Selma's native costumes.

Pressure Point: Servalan in a coat-like dress revealing her thighs and legs made entirely of soft white plastic, complete with hat and wide collar. Later, she sports an elaborately cut and pleated white gown with a large metal insect-shaped decoration holding the dress in place.

Trial: New leather costumes for the whole Liberator crew.

Killer: Insect-like plastic capes for laboratory workers, insect details on their white costumes, safety suits made entirely of modified Michelin Man costumes.

Hudson mentions delegating the costume design to other colleagues for the second half of the second series, so for example, she doesn't identify as the designer of the extravagant costumes of the episode Gambit, although she approves of the work and is still credited as the costume designer on the end credits throughout the second series.

Other work

Hudson continues her involvement with the screen, as a designer, consultant and teacher of designing (for the last four years she has been a Lossett Visiting Scholar each May at the University of Redlands). Her interest in Doctor Who persists, and she has recently produced the front cover of TARDISbound, a book on the series from the publisher I.B. Tauris. She also produced the cover illustration for Iris Wildthyme and the Celestial Omnibus, from publishers Obverse Books.

Sources and links 
Footnotes:

Other sources and links:
"June Hudson's Costume Designs", an extra feature on Blake's 7 Season 3 DVDs.
"June Hudson's Leisure Wear", an extra feature on the Doctor Who Leisure Hive DVD.
The BBC Doctor Who Classic Series Episode Guide 

June Hudson's website
Tom Baker's website (See Doctor Who Costume Designs in the Photos & Videos section)

British costume designers
Living people
Year of birth missing (living people)